"Don't Make It Easy for Me" is a song co-written and recorded by American country music artist Earl Thomas Conley.  It was released in January 1984 as the third single and title track from the album Don't Make It Easy for Me.  The song was Conley's fifth number one country hit.  The single went to number one for one week and spent a total of twelve weeks on the country chart.  The song was written by Conley and Randy Scruggs.

Charts

Weekly charts

Year-end charts

References

1984 singles
Earl Thomas Conley songs
Songs written by Randy Scruggs
Songs written by Earl Thomas Conley
RCA Records singles
1984 songs